Taylorsville is an unincorporated community in Caldwell County, in the U.S. state of Texas. According to the Handbook of Texas, the community had a population of 20 in 2000. It is located within the Greater Austin metropolitan area.

History
The community was named for a local landowner. When the post office in Elm Grove closed in 1890, another one was established at Taylorsville that same year. The settlement had three churches, two steam-powered cotton gins, two general stores, and a population of 150 inhabitants in 1892. The community's post office shut down in 1907. The population then dropped to 25 in the 1930s. It then grew to 40 residents in the late 1940s, but it was not enough to maintain local businesses. The community store closed in 1953. A church and several residences continued to mark the townsite on county maps in the 1980s. The community had a population of 20 in 2000.

Geography

Education
Taylorsville had a school from the mid-1870s until 1884. A school was built in nearby Elm Grove that year, and it closed when the community's population decreased. Students in the community were then sent to attend school in either Dale, McMahan, or Lockhart. Today the community is served by the Lockhart Independent School District.

References

Unincorporated communities in Caldwell County, Texas
Unincorporated communities in Texas